ClueFinders is an educational software series aimed at children aged 8–12 that features a group of mystery-solving teenagers. The series was created by The Learning Company (formerly SoftKey) as a counterpart to their Reader Rabbit series for older, elementary-aged students. The series has received praise for its balance of education and entertainment, resulting in numerous awards.

History

The Learning Company (1997–2001) 
ClueFinders was conceived as a spiritual successor to the Reader Rabbit series. The first ClueFinders title, The ClueFinders 3rd Grade Adventures: The Mystery of Mathra, was released in 1998, with subsequent games being released within the next two years. The ClueFinders 4th Grade Adventures was released in 2000. The Learning Company used their new game as the prototype for Internet Applet technology, which allowed users to download supplementary activities from the ClueFinders website. The ClueFinders 4th Grade Adventures was also the first game to include the A.D.A.P.T. technology, which allowed teachers and parents to monitor the player's progress and included auto-adjustable levels based on the player's abilities.

In 1998, The Learning Company was acquired by Mattel for $3.7 billion. The following year, Mattel sold off their "The Learning Company" assets to Gores Technology Group. In 2000, Mattel Interactive hired professional writers Jill Gorey and Barbara Herndon to design a concept for a TV series, but the franchise never made its way to television. The ClueFinders Reading Adventures was discontinued in 2000. ClueFinders held a writing competition in 2001. Sponsored by The Learning Company, the competition was open to 3rd-6th grade classrooms in the United States. The winning essay, a new adventure for the ClueFinders crew, won its writer an iMac.

Riverdeep/HMH (2001–present) 
In 2001, Riverdeep acquired many of The Learning Company's properties from Gores Technology Group by selling $40 million in stock. Carmen Sandiego, ClueFinders, and Reader Rabbit were then licensed to the KidsEdge Website in 2002, where they were available to play among 170 games and activities. In 2003, The ClueFinders' Reading Adventures was reconfigured to run on Windows XP. The 2004 RCN InterACTION service allowed parents to stream over 35 games in series such as Carmen Sandiego, Clifford the Big Red Dog and ClueFinders over a broadband connection. Compilations including multiple previously released titles, such as ClueFinders Adventure Pack and ClueFinders Triple Pack. These bundle often include a single ClueFinders title (often "The ClueFinders Reading Adventures") along with other games (mostly other The Learning Company games), such as "Adventure Workshop" or "After School Clubhouse." In addition, the 3rd–6th grade titles were re-released on the iOS platform on December 19, 2010. As of 2017, Houghton Mifflin Harcourt (the successor of Riverdeep) is offering the ClueFinders brand as a licensing opportunity on its website.

Design

Plot 
Development of the games' backstory took 16 months. The ClueFinders adventures take place in the real contemporary world, incorporating some elements of fantasy and science fiction.

The main cast of characters include:
 Joni Savage (Josie Savage in UK version): ClueFinders founder
 Santiago Rivera (Sebastian Robertson in UK version): The Spanish-American mechanically-minded member
 Owen Lam: The Asian-American skater dude member
 Leslie Clark (Lucy Clark in UK version): The African-American literary-minded member
 LapTrap, The Turbo T.U.R.T.L.E.: The floating artificially intelligent laptop
 Socrates: The intelligent dog and mascot
They were chosen to be around the same age as their player base after the art director ran various character designs by a group of kids. Some of the unsuccessful designs included animals, rock stars, and FBI agents, which the kids perceived as babysitters instead of teammates. Each character was designed with a distinct personality and identifiable faults to increase their relatability. The developers used a character grid to aid their writing, which contained information such as: "their flaws, their fears, how they met, where they grew up, and their likely reactions to certain situations."

In The ClueFinders 3rd Grade Adventures: The Mystery of Mathra, a great city was built 1000 years ago in the Numerian rainforest until a monster named Mathra invaded. After Mathra was captured, the Numerians abandoned their city, sealed the entrance, and hid the two halves of the key in the far corners of the rainforest. One part was hidden in the Monkey Kingdom and the latter in the Goo Lagoon. Animals had started to disappear in the rainforest once again and Joni's uncle, Dr. Pythagoras, also disappeared. Mr. Limburger (Lindman in the UK version) flies the ClueFinders in his airplane and briefs them on the events going on. The ClueFinders set off to find the lost doctor, animals, and the keys to the Lost Numerian City. However, the evidence suggests that there is more to the disappearances than a 1000-year-old monster as well as a sinister plot behind it.

In The ClueFinders 4th Grade Adventures: Puzzle of the Pyramid, the ClueFinders are on an adventure in Egypt with Professor Botch, Alistair Loveless, and their dog, Socrates. There, at a dig site, they uncover the tomb of Peribsen, a king from the second dynasty. Joni finds a mysterious ring and tries it on her finger, but it magically latches onto her finger. Later that night, Alistair Loveless and his goons kidnap Professor Botch and steal several valuable relics. Loveless intends to unleash Set, the Egyptian God of Evil and Chaos. The ClueFinders are left to recover the relics, rescue Professor Botch, and prevent Loveless and Set from wreaking havoc.

In The ClueFinders 5th Grade Adventures: Secret of the Living Volcano, the ClueFinders are on a mission with Captain Clark, Leslie's sailor grandfather, to find out why so many ships have been disappearing in a certain area of the Pacific Ocean. In one of the wrecked ships, Joni and Santiago discover a pair of metal plaques with strange symbols written on them called CrypTiles. However, when their ship comes into view of a tiny uncharted island, a tsunami promptly forms and hits their ship. Joni, Santiago and LapTrap are stranded on the island and set off to rescue their remaining team members, locate Captain Clark and his crew, and find out what sort of activities are happening on the island.

In The ClueFinders 6th Grade Adventures: The Empire of the Plant People, while playing a game of frisbee, Joni accidentally tosses the disc over the fence into the overgrown yard of their friendly neighbours, Miss Rose. When Joni and Santiago enter Miss Rose's yard to find the frisbee, the ground opens up and swallows them. Owen, Leslie, and LapTrap investigate to look for their lost team members and find a labyrinth under the yard inhabited by self-aware, anthropomorphic talking plants. They learn from a friendly plant named Ficus that the plants have captured Joni and Santiago and are concocting a plan to attack the town above.

In The ClueFinders Math Adventures Ages 9–12: Mystery in the Himalayas, in a village high in the Himalayas, twenty-four priceless treasures have been stolen. An elder of the village calls the ClueFinders to help uncover the treasures and the thief's identity. Many, including the elder's pessimistic apprentice, believe the Yeti is behind the theft, but the clues all point in different directions and it appears a different person is responsible for the theft of each item.

In The ClueFinders Reading Adventures: Mystery of the Missing Amulet, an asteroid has crashed in the Sierra Mountains. The ClueFinders approach the asteroid, discovering it is significantly cool despite its recent crash. Joni touches it, and the ClueFinders get beamed across space, arriving on the planet Millenia. The team is separated into two parts of the Millenia. Joni and Owen then meet Malveera, the princess of Millenia who brought them to help save her planet from the evil sorceress Malicia, who has also captured Santiago and Leslie. The only way to stop her and return to Earth is to locate the two halves of the Amulet of Life hidden by the Doldreks and the Sorrens.

In ClueFinders Search and Solve Adventures: The Phantom Amusement Park, one night, when the ClueFinders are observing a lunar eclipse from their clubhouse, they see an SOS signal coming from an abandoned amusement park on the edge of town. They find Jacques Ramone, the curator of the local art museum, is trapped at the top of the drop-tower ride. He tells them that he was kidnapped and placed there, but says he doesn't know why. After Joni and Owen rescue the curator, Santiago and Leslie are captured by the curator's sister, Mimi Ramone. Joni and Owen investigate the park finding some art supplies and damaged robots, indicated some art forgery crime taking place.

In The ClueFinders: The Incredible Toy Store Adventure, the ClueFinders are heading on a San Francisco cable car to the recently built toy store, Ultimate Toys. Owen goes to retrieve his wallet, along with Joni and LapTrap, while Leslie, Santiago, and AliTrap head into the store, only to be shot by a shrinking ray and captured into a sack. Once they escape from the sack, they realize they've been taken to the sixth floor. Using Owen's red video phone, they contact Leslie and Santiago and inform them of their plight, prompting Leslie and Santiago to try to rescue them. To do this Owen, Joni and LapTrap need to make their way into the toy store and construct a machine to reverse the shrinking effects while nabbing the perpetrator responsible for the shrinking of things in the toy store.

In The ClueFinders: Mystery Mansion Arcade, the ClueFinders explore a creepy house on a hill, thinking that Joni's uncle Dr. Horace Pythagoras sent a distress email that he was trapped in the house and needed rescue. It turns out to be a trap, and the four ClueFinders are separated. Four of the ClueFinders' previous enemies—Fletcher Limburger, Alistair Loveless, Pericles Lear, and Miss Rose—have joined forces with a mysterious new ally and created the trap to get revenge on the ClueFinders.

Gameplay 
The series consists of "multi-subject by grade" programs, in which players practice skills and advance their understanding of grade-based content. The player can choose to play the adventure mode or to play the game's activities outside the adventure in "practice mode." Choosing to play the adventure will lead to a follow-up sequence, which further establishes the premise as well as the overall goal of the game. The bulk of each game involves traveling between different screens in a predetermined area that has various educational activities. The user will have to play these games to advance. Usually, each area will have one activity that needs to be completed to advance, but which can only be played by collecting items from all the other activities in the area.

In all of the games except for The ClueFinders 4th Grade Adventures, the ClueFinders are split into two teams at the start. A portable red videophone allows the two teams to make contact with each other and clicking on the phone provides the user with game hints from the other team. The other team will typically either be serving as backup, looking for clues or else be captured and in need of rescue. Games have different activities divided among different areas, each with their skill and goal. The games contain a number of parodies of and allusions to popular culture and other topics.

In The ClueFinders: Mystery Mansion Arcade, the activities are not as educationally based as the previous games but more arcade-oriented. The mini-games consist of an obstacle course, category matching, a maze game, and a pinball game. In The ClueFinders Math Adventures, the game is set up similar to Clue in that the central goal of each round is to identify three variables—who stole the treasure, which treasure they took, and where they hid it—based on clues. Clues are acquired from playing games and helping the villagers with their work. Using the acquired clues, the player can limit the number of possibilities until, with enough clues, only one remains. When 24 treasures are restored, the game is won.

Graphics and coding 
During the gameplay, 2D computer graphics are used in the style of hand-drawn animated cartoons with animations that use thick outlines and solid colors on two-dimensional backgrounds. For this reason, the series is often described as imitating the look of a Saturday morning cartoon, Scooby-Doo being repeatedly cited by reviewers. Cutscenes, however, use pre-rendered 3D graphics.

Educational goals 
While Reader Rabbit was popular with younger audiences, The Learning Company came up with ClueFinders to appeal to third graders onward for both boys and girls. To match with kids' abstract thinking, the games were activity-centered and included cross-curriculum topics more sophisticated than preschool material, which included algebra, grammar, and spelling. To ensure that users actually learned something, the educational content came first before the puzzles, gameplay, and objectives.

Products in the series

List of games

Compilations

Books
Two ClueFinders books—The Mystery of Microsneezia and The Mystery of the Backlot Banshee— were written by Ellen Weiss and illustrated by Mel Friedman.

Other languages 
 French (titled "Le Club Des Trouvetout"). French versions were distributed/published by The Learning Company subsidiary TLC-Edusoft.
 German (titled "Die Schlaue Bande")
 Portuguese (titled "Os Caça-Pistas")
 Dutch (titled "Junior Detectives")
 Russian (titled "Следопыты")
 Spanish (titled "Los Pequeños Exploradores")
 Swedish (titled "Äventyrarna")
 Norwegian (titled "Eventyrerne")

Reception 

3rd Grade won the 1998 Gold Award from Parents' Choice. During the Opening Day of the Bologna Children's Book Fair on April 8, 1999, the game was awarded the Bologna New Media Prize for the Best Logical Thinking Program.

Computer Shopper and SuperKids described 3rd Grade Adventures as the educational equivalent of the Indiana Jones trilogy, while the Chicago Tribune thought the "hip environmental mystery" eased children into applying their thinking skills through mystery, animation, and challenges, commenting that it "shines in almost every way." Kiplinger's Personal Finance thought 4th Grade Adventures "works hard for its players' enjoyment." Discovery Education wrote that 5th Grade Adventures "seamlessly combines fun and learning." SuperKids praised the "cartoon quality animation and an alluring storyline" of Math Adventures and the Cluedo-inspired gameplay. 01Net asserted that in terms of 5th Grade Adventures, the activities take precedence over the merely incidental storyline. In 2001, the site described the series' graphics as "very colorful" and "truly seductive" but three years later the site decided they were outdated. Asbury Park Press noted that Reading Adventures, like Carmen Sandiego Word Detective, "place[d] reading games in the middle of mysteries." Teach thought the Search and Solve Adventures mystery was engaging and that the game successfully combined storytelling with problem-solving activities, while PC Mag thought it was "mysterious," "chill-inducing," and "engrossing." PC Mag liked The ClueFinders: The Incredible Toy Store Adventure! for its math, science, and language puzzles and its adjustable levels, while The New York Times praised the main cast's culturally diversity and maturity.

Exploring Values Through Literature, Multimedia, and Literacy Events highlighted the series for its multicultural and balanced cast in which the nonwhite characters have equal status to the white character, noting that Leslie and Santiago are the main sources of knowledge. Though noted there were no examples of software with the primary character being non-white. Meanwhile, The Boston Herald commented that the series had "come a long way," the paper suggested that the decision to include a Caucasian (Joni), Asian (Owen), Black (Leslie), and Latino (Santiago) in its main cast smelt of interference from the California School Board standard. The paper praised the series' "television-quality animation, broad educational focus and lively situations," though thought the early games were uneven in difficulty. Exploring Values Through Literature, Multimedia, and Literacy Events further praised the series' focus on character interdependence, or how missions are not successful until and unless they work together. Children's Software Review managing editor Ellen Wolock criticised The Learning Company for focusing too much of its resources on repackaging its old software, commenting that she received the impression the company was "just throw[ing] together" entries in its newer ClueFinders series. Working Mother thought the series offered a "painless way for kids to hone their skills." The Cincinnati Enquirer recommended the "strong" series to gamers who were unable to locate the then-soon-to-be-discontinued title The Sims: Livin' Large, and said "there is a lot to like" about entries in the series, such as its closed captioning of later titles.

One piece of research used the game as a "tool for assessing how children worked on computers in social interactions and influence acceptance by peers in classroom interactions". The Times Shepperton felt 4th Grade did a "nice job of integrating the learning activities into an engaging adventure." Battle Creek Enquirer and The Tennessean felt 4th Grade'''s strong sense of mystery encouraged players to learn academia. Arizona Republic felt Search and Solve would intrigue children due to having the right mix of "scariness and intrigue."4th Grade received positive reviews. The Computer Paper felt that it offered the sugar to help the medicine go down. All Game Guide gave the game four out five stars, writing, "the cut-scenes successfully build excitement, providing an incentive for completing the entire game [though there is no] real reason to play a second time... Gameplay is simple with an easy to use click or click-and-drag mouse control scheme, and the lack of a written manual is overcome with full explanations of all activities within the game...The game seems a delightful mix of adventure and learning." Game Vortex rated the game 80/100, saying, "Clue Finders 4th Grade Adventure: Puzzle of the Pyramid is a typical edutainment game that teaches your child the ins and outs of what he or she needs to know to make it through the fourth grade." 7Wolf Magazine rated the game 70/100, while macHOME gave it 3 out of 5 stars.Reading Adventures received positive reviews. A review at Superkids was mixed. Whilst the "teacher reviewers were especially impressed with the reading comprehension section," they felt that "unfortunately, too many of the [activities] require fast-twitch gaming ability in addition to knowledge of the subject matter." Of the kids appeal, the review stated that "the activities themselves, however, are inconsistent. While some are novel and quite educational...others are tired repeats of games seen many times over in many other programs." It concluded by saying, "this likable Clue Finders adventure provides an entertaining way for kids to practice their reading and language skills. Students who need significant help with their reading skills would do better with a more academically oriented title, and those who are not adept gamers may become frustrated with some of the activities."

South Coast Today appreciated that the series made the activities amusing as well as educational. TechWithKids felt the series had the right combination of scariness and intrigue.

 Commercial performance 
As of 2001, the first six games have sold around 3.5 million copies.

 Awards and nominations 

Since its creation in 1998, the ClueFinders'' series has won over 50 awards and accolades in three years. The Incredible Toy Store was an Edutaining Kids General Learning software pick of 2001.

References

External links 
 
 Official website
 User Manual

Houghton Mifflin Harcourt franchises
Software for children
Mystery video games
Video game franchises introduced in 1998
The Learning Company games
Children's educational video games